This list shows the characters review of Love Sick The Series,

Cast

Love Sick